Wuhu is a prefecture-level city in Anhui, China.

Wuhu may also refer to:

WUHU, a radio station licensed to Smiths Grove, Kentucky, United States
WUHU (software), Weather Underground / HeavyWeather Uploader, software to upload data from personal weather stations to one or more networks
Five Barbarians (Wu Hu), a collective term for various non-Chinese steppe tribes during the period from the Han Dynasty to the Northern Dynasties
Wu Hu period (304–439 AD), or Sixteen Kingdoms, in ancient China
Wu Hu uprising (304–316 CE), a rebellion of unsinicized peoples against Jin China
Wuhu Island, a fictional island in the Wii video game series

See also
Woo Hoo (disambiguation)
Wuhua (disambiguation)